Zabala is a surname of Basque origin. Notable people with the surname include:

Adrián Zabala (1916-2002), Cuban baseball player
Aneurys Zabala (born 1996), Dominican baseball player
Artemio Zabala (born 1935), Filipino Episcopalian bishop
Bruno Mauricio de Zabala (1682-1736), Spanish soldier and colonial administrator
Buddy Zabala (born 1971), Filipino musician
Cedric Bixler-Zavala (born 1974), American musician
César Zabala (born 1961), Paraguayan football (soccer) defender 
Cristian Zabala (born 1998), Argentine football (soccer) midfielder
Diego Zabala (born 1991), Uruguayan football (soccer) attacking midfielder
Esperanza Zabala (born 1974), Spanish Basque artist
Felix "Tuto" Zabala (born 1936), Cuban boxing promoter & manager
Gaizka Mendieta Zabala (born 1974), Spanish football (soccer) player
Herminio Díaz Zabala (born 1964), Spanish professional racing cyclist
Josu Zabala (born 1993), Spanish cyclist
Juan Carlos Zabala (1911-1983), Argentine athlete
Karenth Zabala (born 1996), Bolivian-American football (soccer) player
Loida Zabala (born 1987), Spanish Paralympic powerlifter
Louis Zabala (born 2001), Australian football (soccer) player
Paula Zabala (born 1985), Colombian tennis player
Pedro Zabála (born 1983), Bolivian football (soccer) player
Ronald Zabala-Goetschel (born 1966), Ecuadorian equestrian
Santiago Zabala (born 1975), Spanish philosopher
Tincho Zabala (1923-2001), Uruguayan film actor
Victoria Zabala (born 1992), Argentine volleyball player
Wilder Zabala (born 1982), Bolivian football (soccer) defender
Zeny Zabala (1934–2017), Filipina actress

Basque-language surnames